Scott Glacier is a glacier,  wide and over  long, flowing north-northwest to the Antarctic coast between Denman Glacier and Mill Island. It was discovered by the Western Base Party of the Australasian Antarctic Expedition (1911-1914) under Mawson and named for Capt. Robert F. Scott.

See also
 List of glaciers in the Antarctic
 Chugunov Island

References

 

Glaciers of Queen Mary Land